Sapateiro  is a Portuguese language occupational surname literally meaning "shoemaker". Notable people with the surname include:

Fábio Alexandre Martins Sapateiro, Portuguese footballer 
José Sapateiro, Portuguese traveler of the fifteenth century
Chico Sapateiro, a nickname of Francisco Miguel Duarte, Portuguese writer

Occupational surnames
Portuguese-language surnames